An archetype is a concept found in areas relating to behavior, modern psychological theory, and literary analysis.

Archetype may also refer to:

 Archetype (information science), a formal reusable model of a domain concept
 Archetype (video game), a 2010 first-person shooter video game
 Archetype (textual criticism), a text that originates a textual tradition
  is a linguistic unit reconstructed by the historical comparative method
 Archetypes (podcast), a podcast by Meghan, Duchess of Sussex

Music
 Archetype (Fear Factory album), 2004
 "Archetype" (Fear Factory song), 2004
 Archetype (Tonedeff album), 2005
 Archetype (Susumu Hirasawa album)
 "Archetype", a song on the EP Enter Suicidal Angels by Dark Tranquility
 Archetypes, the alternative title of the album White Light/White Heat, 1968, used briefly for a reissue in 1974

See also
 Stock character, a stereotypical person whom audiences readily recognize from frequent recurrences